There has been a substantial population of Russians in Kazakhstan since the 19th century. Although their numbers have been reduced since the breakup of the Soviet Union, they remain prominent in Kazakh society today. Russians formed a plurality of the Kazakh SSR's population for several decades.

Early colonisation
The first Rus' traders and soldiers began to appear on the northwestern edge of modern Kazakhstan territory in the early 16th century, when Cossacks established the forts that later became the cities of Oral (Ural'sk, est. 1520) and Atyrau (Gur'yev). Ural, Siberian and later Orenburg Cossack Hosts gradually established themselves in parts of northern Kazakhstan. In 1710s and 1720s Siberian Cossacks founded Oskemen (Ust-Kamennaya), Semey (Semipalatinsk) and Pavlodar (Fort Koryakovskiy) as border forts and trading posts.

Russian imperial authorities followed and were able to seize Kazakh territory because the local khanates were preoccupied by a war with Kalmyks (Oirats, Dzungars). Kazakhs were increasingly caught in the middle between the Kalmyks and the Russians. In 1730 Abul Khayr, one of the khans of the Lesser Horde, sought Russian assistance against the stronger Kalmyks, and the Russians in exchange for help gained permanent control of the Lesser Horde as a result of his decision. The Russians conquered the Middle Horde by 1798, but the Great Horde managed to remain independent until the 1820s, when the expanding Kokand Khanate to the south forced the Great Horde khans to choose Russian protection, which seemed to them the lesser of two evils. In 1824, Siberian Cossacks from Omsk founded a fortress on the upper Ishim River named Akmolinsk, which is known today as Astana, capital of Kazakhstan. In the same year they founded the fort of Kokshetau.

In the 1850s, the construction of Russian forts began in southern Kazakhstan including Fort Shevchenko (Fort Alexandrovsky), Kyzylorda (Fort Petrovsky), Kazaly (Kazalinsk) and Almaty (Verniy).

In 1863, the Russian Empire created two administrative districts, the Governor-Generalships in Central Asia of Russian Turkestan (the oasis region to the south of the Kazakh steppes and Zhetysu (Semirechye) region) and that of the Steppe (modern eastern and northern Kazakhstan including the lands of the Siberian and Semiryechensk Cossask Hosts) with their capital at Omsk. The north-west of Kazakhstan was at the time part of Orenburg Governorate. First Governor-General Gerasim Kolpakovsky of the Steppe region (and all his future successors) was also ataman of Siberian Cossacks symbolizing the important role the Cossacks played in the Russian colonization of Kazakh territories. In 1869 Russian settlers founded the town of Aktobe (Aktyubinsk), in  1879 Kostanay. In the 1860s  General Mikhail Chernyayev conquered the only towns that existed in Kazakhstan before the Russian conquest Hazrat-e Turkestan, Taraz and Shymkent that belonged to the Khanate of Kokand.

Christianity spread in the predominantly Muslim region together with Russian colonists: the Russian Orthodox Church established a Central Asian bishopric in 1871 with its bishop first residing in Verniy and after 1916 in Tashkent.
In the 1890s, many non-Cossack Russian  settlers migrated into the fertile lands of northern and eastern Kazakhstan. In 1906 the Trans-Aral Railway between Orenburg and Tashkent was completed, further facilitating Russian and Ukrainian migration to Central Asia.

Between 1906 and 1912, more than half a million Ukrainian and Russian farms were started in Kazakhstan as part of the reforms of the Russian minister of the interior Petr Stolypin. By 1917 there were close to a million slavs in Kazakhstan, about 30% of the total population.  
Analysis of data on migrants who arrived during the Stolypin agrarian reform (1906-1912) on the territory of Kazakhstan shows that 83.1% of the settlers were from Ukraine, the rest came from the southern regions of Russia (16.8%).

Soviet period
Russians of Kazakhstan together with other ethnic groups of the region suffered heavily during the Russian Civil War and Collectivisation in the USSR and endured repeated famines and unrest. In 1918-1931  Basmachi Revolt affected areas of southern Kazakh SSR often taking a form of an ethnic conflict between Russian and Ukrainian farmers and native Muslim nomads. Thousands of Russian settlers are thought to have been killed by the Kazakhs in the violence and this was followed by equally bloody reprisals against the nomadic population by the Red Army.

The Kazakh Autonomous Soviet Socialist Republic was established as part of the RSFSR - the process was not straightforward and included disputes over territories. On 26 August 1920, the Soviet government issued a decree signed by Mikhail Kalinin and Vladimir Lenin "On the formation of the Autonomous Kyrgyz (Kazakh) Soviet Socialist Republic" in the RSFSR. The city of Orenburg, with its majorly Kazakh population, became the capital of the Kazakh Autonomous Republic. 

When it came to the formation of borders, there were many opponents to the inclusion of Akmola, Semipalatinsk and Ural regions in the KazASSR. Others, on the contrary, demanded to include the territories of the Omsk region, Barnaul district, Altai region of Russia and some parts of Central Asia into the structure of Kazakhstan. The expediency of the inclusion of Kustanay region into Kazakhstan was comprehensively proved in a note by Akhmet Baitursynov and Mukhamedjan Seralin. It was necessary to prove the necessity of inclusion of Akmola and Semipalatinsk regions. As strangely as it was, these territories, native to Kazakhs, belonged to Western Siberia. Thus, in 1920, the member of the Revcom Alikhan Yermekov in Moscow was at the reception of the leader of the state Vladimir Lenin. In the Kremlin, he made an important report "On the situation of the Kirghiz region in general, and on the issue of borders in particular". Thanks to this document, the Kazakh authorities managed to defend Akmola, Semipalatinsk and Atyrau regions. The republic included a 10-verst long strip along the Urals and Irtysh Rivers, where the Cossacks settled during the expansion of Tsarist Russia.

Many European Soviet citizens and much of Russia's industry were relocated to Kazakhstan during World War II, when Nazi armies threatened to capture all the European industrial centers of the Soviet Union. These migrants founded mining towns which quickly grew to become major industrial centers such as Karaganda (1934), Zhezkazgan (1938), Temirtau (1945) and Ekibastuz (1948). In 1955, the town of Baikonur was built to support the Baikonur Cosmodrome to this day its administered by Russia.

Many more Russians arrived in the years 1953–1965, during the so-called Virgin Lands Campaign of Soviet general secretary Nikita Khrushchev. Still more settlers came in the late 1960s and 70s, when the government paid bonuses to workers participating in a program to relocate Soviet industry close to the extensive coal, gas, and oil deposits of Central Asia. By 1979 ethnic Russians in Kazakhstan numbered about 5,500,000, almost 40% of the total population.

In December 1986, Soviet general secretary Mikhail Gorbachev appointed Gennady Kolbin, with no ties to the republic, as the first secretary of the Central Committee of Communist Party of Kazakh SSR, breaking with a tradition of ethnic Kazakh dominance in the local administration. Following several incidents of ethnic unrest in 1989, Kolbin was replaced by Nursultan Nazarbayev who following the dissolution of the Soviet Union became the president of independent Kazakhstan.

According to the 1989 Soviet census, 66% of Russians living in Kazakhstan had been born there, the highest proportion of all Soviet republics besides the Russian SFSR. 37% of the Russians who were born elsewhere had lived in the Kazakh SSR for at least 20 years.

Post-Soviet period
Although Nazarbayev is widely credited with peaceful preservation of the delicate inter-ethnic balance in Kazakhstan, hundreds of thousands of Russians left Kazakhstan in the 1990s due to the perceived lack of economic opportunities. A number of factors contributed to this situation. Following independence from the Soviet Union, the Kazakh government adopted a policy of developing the state language that sought to affirm the ethnically Kazakh nature of the country and promote Kazakh language and culture. One aspect of this policy was the government's decision to define Kazakhstan as the national state of the ethnically Kazakh people in the country's first constitution in 1993 and again in its second constitution in 1995.

In 1994 Kazakhstan held its first parliamentary elections since independence. In these elections, Kazakh candidates won a disproportionate number of seats compared to Russian candidates relative to the demographic makeup of the country at the time. Observers attributed the over-representation of Kazakh politicians to electoral tampering carried out by the government, primarily through gerrymandering. Many Russians interpreted this as an attempt to promote Kazakh domination of the state at the expense of Russian influence. 

A major factor that contributed to the alienation of Russians and the increase of inter-ethnic tensions in post-Soviet Kazakhstan was the government's language policy. Following independence, the government adopted Kazakh as the country's official language. Russian was designated as the language of interethnic communication but not given official status. Over the course of the 1990s, the government mandated the instruction of Kazakh in schools and introduced Kazakh language fluency requirements for all public sector jobs. Many Russians objected to these measures and advocated for official bilingualism, which was denied.

The government's language policy struck many Russians as inequitable, in part because at the time of independence Russian was the de facto language of communication in government and business. Most Kazakhs were already fluent in Russian, while very few Russians were fluent in Kazakh. This policy had the effect of excluding the vast majority of Russian-speakers from some of the most coveted professional occupations. These various developments contributed to an increasing sense of marginalization and exclusion among Russians in Kazakhstan. Many Russians felt that there were limited opportunities for them and their children in the country, as a result of the government's new linguistic and educational policies. These and other grievances were major causes of the massive emigration of Russians from Kazakhstan that took place in the 1990s.

By 1999, the number of Russians in Kazakhstan dropped to 4,479,618 people, roughly 30% of Kazakhstan's population. Emigration from Kazakhstan reached its peak in 1994, when 344,112 people emigrated from Kazakhstan to Russia. Since then, it has consistently decreased, perhaps because those most eager to leave or with the resources to leave have already done so. At the beginning of his presidency in 2000, Vladimir Putin met with leaders of the Russian community in Kazakhstan who explained to him the situation they faced in the country. This meeting resulted in a proposal of a massive departure of the remainder of Russians from Kazakhstan. It was suggested that these migrants would revitalize depopulated areas of central Russia and provide a counterweight to the demographic decline of Russians within the Russian Federation.

However, support for the idea has since evaporated and the Russian government has not provided the resources necessary for massive repatriation. The majority of Russians who emigrated from Kazakhstan were Russians born in Russia who had moved to Kazakhstan later in life, primarily for professional reasons. Most of this group resided in urban areas and tended to be more highly educated. In contrast, Russians who were born in the country and whose families have lived in Kazakhstan for two to three generations were far less likely to emigrate. This group is concentrated in rural regions, especially in the northern part of the country. In the 1990s, this group made up two thirds of Kazakhstan's Russian population but only one third  of the migrants who left the country.

Russians are still an influential socio-political group in Kazakhstan, and they remain active in Kazakhstan's public, military, cultural and economic life. Also the Kazakh language is the state language, while Russian is now also officially used as an equal language to Kazakh in Kazakhstan's public institutions. Kazakhstan is also part of the Eurasian Economic Union with Russia.

Number and share

Censuses 

Number and share of Russians according to the census over the years by regions:

Prominent ethnic Russians from Kazakhstan

 Nik Antropov
 Anatoli Boukreev
 Alexander Dutov
 Gennady Golovkin (half-Korean)
 Vassiliy Jirov
 Vsevolod Ivanov
 Andrey Kashechkin
 Andrei Kivilev
 Nikolay Koksharov
 Ruslana Korshunova
 Yuri Lonchakov
 Sergei Lukyanenko
 Vladimir Muravyov
 Vladimir Zhirinovsky
 Viktor Patsayev
 Vitaliy Savin
 Vladimir Smirnov
 Adolf Tolkachev
 Alexander Volkov
 Oleg Yankovsky
 Alexander Vinokourov
 Ilya Ilyin
 Igor Sysoev
 Olga Rypakova
 Olga Shishigina
 Dmitriy Balandin

See also
Demographics of Kazakhstan
Ethnic Russians in post-Soviet states
Ukrainians in Kazakhstan 
Kazakhs in Russia

References

Russians left behind in Central Asia, by Robert Greenall, BBC News, 23 November 2005.
Russian 'separatists' highlight ethnic tensions, by Sergei Blagov, Asia Times, 16 June 2000.
Kazakh-Russian relations by Erlan Aben  Institute for Central Asian and Caucasian Studies, September 2000.

Ethnic groups in Kazakhstan
European diaspora in Kazakhstan

Kazakhstan
Kazakhstan
Kazakhstan–Russia relations